The 2022 Internazionali di Tennis d'Abruzzo was a professional tennis tournament played on clay courts. It was the fourth edition of the tournament which was part of the 2022 ATP Challenger Tour. It took place in Francavilla al Mare, Italy between 16 and 22 May 2022.

Singles main-draw entrants

Seeds

 1 Rankings are as of 9 May 2022.

Other entrants
The following players received wildcards into the singles main draw:
  Matteo Arnaldi
  Matteo Gigante
  Francesco Maestrelli

The following players received entry into the singles main draw using protected rankings:
  Jeremy Jahn
  Wu Yibing

The following players received entry into the singles main draw as alternates:
  Filippo Baldi
  Giovanni Fonio

The following players received entry from the qualifying draw:
  Paweł Ciaś
  Davide Galoppini
  Omar Giacalone
  Harold Mayot
  Gian Marco Ortenzi
  Arthur Reymond

The following players received entry as lucky losers:
  Riccardo Balzerani
  Tristan Schoolkate

Champions

Singles

 Matteo Arnaldi def.  Francesco Maestrelli 6–3, 6–7(7–9), 6–4.

Doubles

 Dan Added /  Hernán Casanova def.  Davide Pozzi /  Augusto Virgili 6–3, 7–5.

References

2022 ATP Challenger Tour
2022 in Italian tennis
May 2022 sports events in Italy
Internazionali di Tennis d'Abruzzo